The vacuum magnetic permeability (variously vacuum permeability, permeability of free space, permeability of vacuum), also known as the magnetic constant, is the magnetic permeability in a classical vacuum. It is a physical constant, conventionally written as μ0  (pronounced "mu nought" or "mu zero"). Its purpose is to quantify the strength of the magnetic field emitted by an electric current.  Expressed in terms of SI base units, it has the unit kg⋅m⋅s−2·A−2. 

Its value in SI units as recommended  by CODATA 2018 (published in May 2019) is:

From 1948 to 2019, μ0 had a defined value (per the former definition of the SI ampere), equal to:

The deviation of the recommended measured value from the former defined value is statistically significant, at about 3.6σ, listed as μ0/() − 1 = .

The terminology of permeability and susceptibility was introduced by William Thomson, 1st Baron Kelvin in 1872. The modern notation of  permeability as μ and permittivity as ε has been in use since the 1950s.

The ampere-defined vacuum permeability
Two thin, straight, stationary, parallel wires, a distance r apart in free space, each carrying a current I, will exert a force on each other.  Ampère's force law states that the magnetic force Fm per length L is given by

From  1948 until 2019  the ampere was defined as "that constant current which, if maintained in two straight parallel conductors of infinite length, of negligible circular cross section, and placed 1 meter apart in vacuum, would produce between these conductors a force equal to  newton per meter of length".

The current in this definition needed to be measured with a known weight and known separation of the wires, defined in terms of the international standards of mass, length and time in order to produce a standard for the ampere (and this is what the  Kibble balance was designed for).

Terminology
Standards organizations have recently moved to magnetic constant as the preferred name for μ0, although the older name continues to be listed as a synonym. Historically, the constant μ0 has had different names. In the 1987 IUPAP Red book, for example, this constant was still called permeability of vacuum. Another, now rather rare and obsolete, term is "magnetic permittivity of vacuum". See, for example, Servant et al. The term "vacuum permeability" (and variations thereof, such as "permeability of free space") remains very widespread.

The name "magnetic constant" was used by standards organizations in order to avoid use of the terms "permeability" and "vacuum", which have physical meanings. This change of preferred name had been made because μ0 was a defined value, and was not the result of experimental measurement (see below). In the new SI system, the permeability of vacuum no longer has a defined value, but is a measured quantity, with an uncertainty related to that of the (measured) dimensionless fine structure constant.

Systems of units and historical origin of value of μ0
In principle, there are several equation systems that could be used to set up a system of electrical quantities and units.
Since the late 19th century, the fundamental definitions of current units have been related to the definitions of mass, length, and time units, using Ampère's force law. However, the precise way in which this has "officially" been done has changed many times, as measurement techniques and thinking on the topic developed.
The overall history of the unit of electric current, and of the related question of how to define a set of equations for describing electromagnetic phenomena, is very complicated. Briefly, the basic reason why μ0 has the value it does is as follows.

Ampère's force law describes the experimentally-derived fact that, for two thin, straight, stationary, parallel wires, a distance r apart, in each of which a current I flows, the force per unit length, Fm/L, that one wire exerts upon the other in the vacuum of free space would be given by

Writing the constant of proportionality as km gives

The form of km needs to be chosen in order to set up a system of equations, and a value then needs to be allocated in order to define the unit of current.

In the old "electromagnetic (emu)" system of equations defined in the late 19th century, km was chosen to be a pure number, 2, distance was measured in centimetres, force was measured in the cgs unit dyne, and the currents defined by this equation were measured in the "electromagnetic unit (emu) of current" (also called the "abampere").  A practical unit to be used by electricians and engineers, the ampere, was then defined as equal to one tenth of the electromagnetic unit of current.

In another system, the "rationalized metre–kilogram–second (rmks) system" (or alternatively the "metre–kilogram–second–ampere (mksa) system"), km is written as μ0/2π, where μ0 is a measurement-system constant called the "magnetic constant".
The value of μ0 was chosen such that the rmks unit of current is equal in size to the ampere in the emu system: μ0 was defined to be .

Historically, several different systems (including the two described above) were in use simultaneously. In particular, physicists and engineers used different systems, and physicists used three different systems for different parts of physics theory and a fourth different system (the engineers' system) for laboratory experiments. In 1948, international decisions were made by standards organizations to adopt the rmks system, and its related set of electrical quantities and units, as the single main international system for describing electromagnetic phenomena in the International System of Units.

Significance in electromagnetism
The magnetic constant μ0 appears in Maxwell's equations, which describe the properties of electric and magnetic fields and electromagnetic radiation, and relate them to their sources.  In particular, it appears in relationship to quantities such as permeability and magnetization density, such as the relationship that defines the magnetic H-field in terms of the magnetic B-field.  In real media, this relationship has the form:

where M is the magnetization density. In vacuum, M = 0.

In the International System of Quantities (ISQ), the speed of light in vacuum, is related to the magnetic constant and the electric constant (vacuum permittivity), by the equation:

Conversely, as the permittivity is related to the fine structure constant, the permeability can be derived from the latter (using the Planck constant, h, and the elementary charge, e):

In the new SI units, only the fine structure constant is a measured value in SI units in the expression on the right, since the remaining constants have defined values in SI units.

See also
Characteristic impedance of vacuum
Electromagnetic wave equation
Mathematical descriptions of the electromagnetic field
New SI definitions
Sinusoidal plane-wave solutions of the electromagnetic wave equation
Vacuum permittivity

Notes

References

Fundamental constants

el:Μαγνητική σταθερά
it:Permeabilità magnetica